The Bullfighter's Suit (Spanish:El traje de luces) is a 1947 Spanish drama film directed by Edgar Neville and starring José Nieto and José Prada. The film is set in the world of bullfighting and presents a more downbeat view of the sport in contrast to other films of the era that tended to be more celebratory. The title refers to Traje de luces, the traditional toreador's costume.

Synopsis 
A young bullfighter full of illusions triumphs in Mexico and decides to get married there and forget about his old Spanish girlfriend, who by then has just given birth to his son.

Cast
 Ricardo Acero
 Julia Caba Alba 
 Alfonso de Córdoba 
 Nani Fernandez 
 Casimiro Hurtado 
 Mary Lamar 
 José Nieto 
 José Prada 
 Rafael Romero Marchent

References

Bibliography
 Bentley, Bernard. A Companion to Spanish Cinema. Boydell & Brewer 2008.

External links 

1947 films
1947 drama films
Spanish drama films
1940s Spanish-language films
Films directed by Edgar Neville
Films based on Spanish novels
Bullfighting films
Cifesa films
Spanish black-and-white films
1940s Spanish films